Mabrouk Haiça Rouaï (born 1 November 2000) is a French professional footballer who plays as a midfielder for Portuguese club Estoril.

Professional career
On 22 July 2020, Rouaï signed his first professional contract with Nacional until 2024. Rouaï made his professional debut with Nacional in a 1-0 LigaPro win over Casa Pia A.C. on 1 December 2019.

Personal life
Born in France, Rouaï was born to an Algerian father and a Tunisian mother.

References

External links

2000 births
Footballers from Marseille
French sportspeople of Algerian descent
French sportspeople of Tunisian descent
Living people
French footballers
Association football midfielders
C.D. Nacional players
G.D. Estoril Praia players
Liga Portugal 2 players
Primeira Liga players
French expatriate footballers
French expatriate sportspeople in Portugal
Expatriate footballers in Portugal